Hellinsia bhutanensis is a moth of the family Pterophoridae. It is found in Bhutan.

References

Moths described in 1995
bhutanensis
Moths of Asia